Olivia Dalila Rugama Carmona (born April 9, 1984, in Managua) is Nicaraguan javelin thrower. She represented her nation Nicaragua at the 2004 Summer Olympics, and also registered her own national record of 55.28 metres in the women's javelin throw at the 2007 Bolivarian Games in Caracas, Venezuela. Throughout her career, Rugama was part of the team of the Polytechnic University of Nicaragua's track and field squad.

Rugama qualified for the Nicaraguan squad in the women's javelin throw at the 2004 Summer Olympics in Athens, by granting an invitation from the Nicaraguan Olympic Committee and the IAAF under the Universality rule with an entry mark of 53.23. Rugama threw a javelin with a satisfying distance of 51.42 metres on her second attempt in the prelims, but her effort was not sufficient to compete for the final round with a fortieth-place finish.

Dalila Rugama has won in 4 times (2001, 2006, 2013 and 2017) the Women's Javelin Throw and 1 time (2006) the Women's Shot Put
in the Central American Games. Similarly won in 12 times (2003, 2004, 2005, 2007, 2010, 2011, 2012, 2013, 2015, 2016, 2017 and 2018) the Women's Javelin Throw and 1 time (2018) the Women's Shot Put in the Central American Championships in Athletics.

Dalila Rugama is the best in the Women's Javelin Throw in the history of Central American.

International Competitions

References

External links

1984 births
Living people
Nicaraguan female athletes
Nicaraguan javelin throwers
Olympic athletes of Nicaragua
Athletes (track and field) at the 2004 Summer Olympics
Athletes (track and field) at the 2016 Summer Olympics
Female javelin throwers
Sportspeople from Managua
Athletes (track and field) at the 2003 Pan American Games
Athletes (track and field) at the 2007 Pan American Games
Athletes (track and field) at the 2011 Pan American Games
Athletes (track and field) at the 2015 Pan American Games
Athletes (track and field) at the 2019 Pan American Games
Pan American Games competitors for Nicaragua
Competitors at the 2002 Central American and Caribbean Games
Competitors at the 2006 Central American and Caribbean Games
Competitors at the 2018 Central American and Caribbean Games
Central American Games gold medalists for Nicaragua
Central American Games medalists in athletics
Central American Games bronze medalists for Nicaragua